Poltys is a genus of orb-weaver spiders first described by C. L. Koch in 1843. Many species are cryptic and are known to masquerade as leaves and twigs during the day, and build an orb web at night to capture prey. The shape of the abdomen which often gives the impression of a rough and broken branch can vary among individuals within a species. The web is eaten up before dawn and reconstructed after dusk.

Species
 it contains forty-three species:
Poltys acuminatus Thorell, 1898 – Myanmar
Poltys apiculatus Thorell, 1892 – Singapore
Poltys baculiger Simon, 1907 – Gabon
Poltys bhabanii (Tikader, 1970) – India
Poltys bhavnagarensis Patel, 1988 – India
Poltys caelatus Simon, 1907 – Sierra Leone, Gabon, São Tomé and Príncipe
Poltys columnaris Thorell, 1890 – India, Sri Lanka, Indonesia (Sumatra), Japan
Poltys corticosus Pocock, 1898 – East Africa
Poltys dubius (Walckenaer, 1841) – Vietnam
Poltys elevatus Thorell, 1890 – Indonesia (Sumatra)
Poltys ellipticus Han, Zhang & Zhu, 2010 – China
Poltys fornicatus Simon, 1907 – São Tomé and Príncipe
Poltys frenchi Hogg, 1899 – New Guinea, indonesia (Moluccas), Australia (Queensland)
Poltys furcifer Simon, 1881 – Tanzania (Zanzibar), South Africa
Poltys godrejii Bastawade & Khandal, 2006 – India
Poltys grayi Smith, 2006 – Australia (Lord Howe Is.)
Poltys hainanensis Han, Zhang & Zhu, 2010 – China
Poltys horridus Locket, 1980 – Comoros, Seychelles
Poltys idae (Ausserer, 1871) – China, Borneo
Poltys illepidus C. L. Koch, 1843 (type) – Thailand to Australia (mainland, Lord Howe Is., Norfolk Is.)
Poltys jujorum Smith, 2006 – Australia (Queensland)
Poltys kochi Keyserling, 1864 – Mauritius, Madagascar
Poltys laciniosus Keyserling, 1886 – Australia
Poltys longitergus Hogg, 1919 – Indonesia (Sumatra)
Poltys milledgei Smith, 2006 – Australia (Western Australia, Northern Territory), Indonesia (Bali, Sumbawa)
Poltys monstrosus Simon, 1897 – Sierra Leone
Poltys mouhoti (Günther, 1862) – Vietnam
Poltys nagpurensis Tikader, 1982 – Iran, India
Poltys nigrinus Saito, 1933 – Taiwan
Poltys noblei Smith, 2006 – Australia (Queensland, New South Wales, Victoria)
Poltys pannuceus Thorell, 1895 – Myanmar
Poltys pogonias Thorell, 1891 – India (Nicobar Is.)
Poltys pygmaeus Han, Zhang & Zhu, 2010 – China
Poltys raphanus Thorell, 1898 – Myanmar
Poltys rehmanii Bastawade & Khandal, 2006 – India
Poltys reuteri Lenz, 1886 – Madagascar
Poltys squarrosus Thorell, 1898 – Myanmar
Poltys stygius Thorell, 1898 – Myanmar to Australia (Queensland)
Poltys timmeh Smith, 2006 – New Caledonia, Loyalty Is.
Poltys turriger Simon, 1897 – Vietnam
Poltys turritus Thorell, 1898 – Myanmar
Poltys unguifer Simon, 1909 – Vietnam
Poltys vesicularis Simon, 1889 – Madagascar

References

Araneidae
Araneomorphae genera
Spiders of Africa
Spiders of Asia